Freddie Winnai (April 8, 1905 Philadelphia, Pennsylvania  – September 4, 1977 Philadelphia, Pennsylvania) was an American racecar driver during the AAA era.

Indianapolis 500 results

References

Indianapolis 500 drivers
1905 births
1977 deaths
Racing drivers from Philadelphia